Aecidium cannabis is a species of fungus in the Pucciniales order. It is a  plant pathogen.

References 

Fungal plant pathogens and diseases
Pucciniales
Fungi described in 1927